Íñigo Sarasola Laskurain (born 10 June 1987 in Villabona, Gipuzkoa) is a Spanish professional footballer who plays as a defender. On 2 July 2012, he signed a 1,5 year contract with Olimpija Ljubljana.

References

External links
 PrvaLiga profile 
 
 Futbolme profile 

1987 births
Living people
Spanish footballers
Footballers from the Basque Country (autonomous community)
Association football defenders
Real Sociedad footballers
Real Unión footballers
NK Olimpija Ljubljana (2005) players
Slovenian PrvaLiga players
Spanish expatriate footballers
Spanish expatriate sportspeople in Slovenia
Expatriate footballers in Slovenia